In the Yangzhou massacre, Chinese forces under Tian Shengong killed thousands of foreign merchants in Yangzhou in 760 CE during the Tang dynasty.

Yangzhou, at the junction of the Yangtze River and the Grand Canal, was a center of commerce, finance and industry, and one of the wealthiest cities in Tang China, with a large population of foreign merchants.

In 760 CE, the Jiedu envoy of Huainan, Liu Zhan (劉展), started a mutiny with his brother Liu Yin. Their army initially defeated the army of the governor, Deng Jingshan (鄧景山), at Xucheng County (modern Sihong, Jiangsu), before crossing the Yangtze River and defeating Li Yao, who fled to Xuancheng.
On the advice of famed general Guo Ziyi, Deng recruited a general from Pinglu, Tian Shengong (田神功), to suppress the revolt. Tian and his army landed at Jinshan on Hangzhou Bay, and despite initial losses he defeated Liu's army of 8000 elite soldiers at Guangling. Liu Zhan himself was shot through the eye with an arrow and beheaded.

Since Tian had previously fought for the An Shi Rebellion, he was interested in reingratiating himself with the Tang Emperor. He chose Yangzhou as the ideal target from which to loot gifts for the Emperor. When Tian's forces arrived, they robbed the inhabitants, killing thousands of Arab and Persian merchants.
Tian then travelled to the Tang capital, Chang'an, and presented looted gold and silver to the emperor.

In the Guangzhou massacre in 879, up to 120,000 Muslim Arabs, Persians, Jews, Zoroastrians, and Christians were killed by the Chinese rebel leader Huang Chao.

See also 
List of massacres in China

References

External links 
 

760s conflicts
8th-century massacres
Battles involving the Tang dynasty
Yangzhou
8th century in China
History of Jiangsu
Massacres in China
760
War crimes in China